Svoboda is a rural locality (a village) in Malinovsky Selsoviet, Belebeyevsky District, Bashkortostan, Russia. The population was 48 as of 2010. There are 2 streets.

Geography 
Svoboda is located 7 km southwest of Belebey (the district's administrative centre) by road. Vesyolaya Roshcha is the nearest rural locality.

References 

Rural localities in Belebeyevsky District